Dream River is the fifteenth studio album by American singer-songwriter Bill Callahan, released on September 17, 2013 on Drag City. Recorded by Erik Wofford, the album is Callahan's fourth to be released under his own name.

Released to critical acclaim, the album reached number forty-four on the UK Albums Chart.

Background and recording
Bill Callahan began writing songs for Dream River in August 2012, with the idea of it becoming an album to listen to late at night. Callahan noted, "[Dream River is] the last record you could listen to at the end of the day, before you go to bed, around midnight. [I wanted it to be] smooth and relaxing, the perfect end to a person's day."

Describing his usual recording method as an all-encompassing experience, Callahan notes that the process differed for Dream River: "You sort of dread [recording an album], knowing you have to go into the abyss, because it gets more and more intense, and as the boulder gets bigger and bigger and heavier and heavier, the harder it is to let go. I wanted to see if I could have more of a life, to do other things while I'm making a record. I pretty much did."

Writing and composition
Regarding the album's lyrical content, and the personal nature of Dream River'''s songs, Callahan noted, "I feel like there's already a written narrative going on everywhere. All the different situations and realities you're in, like words floating by. It's something that I didn't start thinking about until recently, but you can hitch that ride, that narrative that's already been created. You just have to read it and write it down."

Critical receptionDream River received widespread critical acclaim upon its release. At Metacritic, which assigns a normalized rating out of 100 to reviews from mainstream critics, the album has received an average score of 84, based on 33 reviews, indicating "universal acclaim". Pitchfork gave the album a "Best New Music" designation, with staff writer Lindsay Zoladz stating: "At its core, this is a record about accepting and even embracing the smallness of human life, and how difficult that can be, given our damnably innate sense of adventure, ambition, and restlessness. [...] For once he’s not wishing he were an eagle or a tempest or a sunset. He is just Bill Callahan, flying his small plane with a co-pilot by his side, and for the moment at least, that is enough." The A.V. Club's Jason Heller wrote: "As a portrayal of Bill Callahan by Bill Callahan, Dream River doesn't chew an inch of scenery; instead it dwells in knowing glances and haunted whispers." In a mostly positive review, AllMusic's Thom Jurek wrote: "With Dream River, fans already know what to expect from the man lyrically, and it can't be argued with qualitatively. When you place those lyrics in the context of something so subtly adventurous musically, the result is both engaging and seductive." Mojo magazine called Dream River'' Callahan's "most beguiling album yet" in a five-star review and later rated it the best album of the year for 2013.

Accolades

Track listing

Personnel

Musicians
 Bill Callahan – vocals, guitar
 Matt Kinsey – guitar
 Jamie Zuverza – bass, wurlitzer, organ
 Thor Harris – congas, clave, drum kit

Additional musicians
 Brian Beattie – percussion, upright piano
 Chojo Jacques – fiddle
 Beth Galiger – flute

Recording personnel
 Erik Wofford – recording
 Brian Beattie – mixing
 Brad Bell – mixing assistant
 Roger Siebel – mastering

Artwork
 Paul Ryan – front painting
 Bill Callahan – ink drawings

Charts

References

2013 albums
Bill Callahan (musician) albums
Drag City (record label) albums